Magnus Troest (born 5 June 1987) is a Danish professional footballer who plays as a centre-back for Italian Serie D club Nola 1925.

Club career

Early years
Born in Copenhagen, Troest started playing football for several local clubs. He debuted for the Denmark U16 national team in October 2002, while playing for club B.93. In the summer 2003, the 16-year-old Troest moved abroad to play for English club Aston Villa. The club reportedly wanted to sign his big brother Jonas Troest from B.93 as well. Troest signed a three-year contract. He played two years in the youth academy, but did not get his senior debut for Aston Villa.

Midtjylland
In May 2005 he transferred back home to Denmark, to play for FC Midtjylland (FCM) in the top-flight Danish Superliga championship. He initially had to struggle to make the FCM first team, but finally made his senior debut in October 2005. He won the 2005 Danish under-19 Player of the Year award. From the second half of the 2005–06 season, he became a regular in the starting line-up. He scored his first two goals for FCM, as the club beat Aarhus GF 2–1 in March 2006.

Parma and Genoa
He then moved to Parma in 2008 (Parma re-sold half of the contract to Genoa C.F.C. for €1.5 million) and he again performed well, playing nearly 30 games and helping the club into Serie A.

Genoa bought back Troest in June 2009, for €900,000. Troest was one-year loaned to Recreativo de Huelva on 30 August 2009.

He spent the 2010–11 on loan at Atalanta. He played 25 times, and also scored once, the opener of a 2–2 home draw against Cittadella in the penultimate matchday. Atalanta won the championship for the sixth time in history after collecting 79 points, two more than Siena, the runner-up. This title was Troest first senior trophy.

Novara
On 3 August 2015, Troest joined Novara in Serie B. He left at the end of 2017–18 season, which saw the club relegated to third tier, after refusing to pen a new deal.

Juve Stabia
Troest remained in Italian second tier by completing a transfer to Juve Stabia, signing a two-year contract with an option to renew. He took squad number 20, and made his official debut for the club on 16 September 2018 by playing full-90 minutes in a 3–0 success at Siracusa.

Nola 1925
On 9 February 2023, Troest joined Serie D side Nola 1925 on a free transfer.

International career
Troest has amassed 31 appearances with Denmark youth teams.

Personal life
Troest is the younger brother of AB player Jonas Troest. His sister, Stina Troest, is a hurdler who has competed 400 meter hurdles at the Youth Olympic Games in Singapore 2010 and won silver.

Career statistics

Honours
Atalanta
Serie B: 2010–11

Juve Stabia
Serie C: 2018–19 (Group C)

References

External links

 
 Career statistics at Danmarks Radio
 Complete League statistics at danskfodbold.com 
 

1987 births
Living people
Footballers from Copenhagen
Danish men's footballers
Association football defenders
Danish Superliga players
Boldklubben af 1893 players
FC Midtjylland players
Aston Villa F.C. players
Serie B players
Serie C players
Parma Calcio 1913 players
Genoa C.F.C. players
Atalanta B.C. players
S.S.D. Varese Calcio players
S.S. Virtus Lanciano 1924 players
Novara F.C. players
S.S. Juve Stabia players
Segunda División players
Recreativo de Huelva players
Danish expatriate men's footballers
Danish expatriate sportspeople in England
Expatriate footballers in England
Danish expatriate sportspeople in Italy
Expatriate footballers in Italy
Danish expatriate sportspeople in Spain
Expatriate footballers in Spain
Denmark youth international footballers
Denmark under-21 international footballers